KPPK (98.3 FM) is a radio station licensed to Rainier, Oregon, United States. The station is currently owned by Bicoastal Media Licenses IV, LLC.

History
The station was assigned the call letters KJNI on May 2, 2005.  On September 16, 2005, the station changed its call sign to the current KPPK. 
on April 29, 2005 the station was sold to Bicoastal Longview and on December 31, 2007 the station was sold to Bicoastal Media Licenses IV.

References

External links

PPK
Columbia County, Oregon
2005 establishments in Oregon